The Wakely Mountain Fire Observation Station is a historic fire observation station located on Wakely Mountain at Lake Pleasant in Hamilton County, New York. The tower is a prefabricated structure built by the Aermotor Corporation. It is one of the initial ten towers purchased by the State Commission to provide a front line of defense in preserving the Adirondack Forest Preserve from the hazards of forest fires.

It was added to the National Register of Historic Places in 2003.

References

External links

 The Fire Towers of New York

Government buildings completed in 1916
Towers completed in 1916
Government buildings on the National Register of Historic Places in New York (state)
Buildings and structures in Hamilton County, New York
Fire lookout towers in Adirondack Park
Fire lookout towers on the National Register of Historic Places in New York (state)
National Register of Historic Places in Hamilton County, New York